Annick Mercier (born 15 June 1964 in Sallanches) is a French curler.

She participated in the demonstration curling events at the 1988 Winter Olympics and 1992 Winter Olympics, where the French women's team finished in eighth and seventh places respectively.

At the national level, she is a six-time French women's champion curler (1990, 1991, 1992, 1994, 1995, 1996).

Teams

Personal life
Annick Mercier is from family of curlers: her mother Agnès Mercier is known French curler, many times French women's champion, together with daughter she competed on 1988 Winter Olympics, number of World and European championships. Annick's younger brother is Thierry Mercier, curler and coach, many times French champion, he competed on 1992 Winter Olympics, number of Worlds and Euros.

References

External links

Living people
1964 births

Sportspeople from Haute-Savoie
French female curlers
French curling champions
Curlers at the 1988 Winter Olympics
Curlers at the 1992 Winter Olympics
Olympic curlers of France